The 1965 Temple Owls football team was an American football team that represented Temple University as a member of the Middle Atlantic Conference during the 1965 NCAA College Division football season. In its sixth season under head coach George Makris, the team compiled a 5–5 record (3–2 against MAC opponents). The team played its home games at Temple Stadium in Philadelphia.

Schedule

References

Temple
Temple Owls football seasons
Temple Owls football